Aldric Doran Chamblee (born November 17, 1968) is a former American football linebacker. He played for the Tampa Bay Buccaneers from 1991 to 1992.

References

1968 births
Living people
American football linebackers
Virginia Tech Hokies football players
Tampa Bay Buccaneers players